Yuriy Illich Prylypko (11 August 1960 – 7 March 2022) was a Ukrainian politician who served as the mayor of Hostomel during the 2022 Russian invasion of Ukraine. He was killed by Russian soldiers on 7 March 2022.

Biography 

During his tenure and the 2022 Russian invasion of Ukraine, President Volodymyr Zelenskyy awarded the title of Hero City on 6 March to six Ukrainian cities and towns that defended themselves against invading Russian soldiers, including Hostomel.

Prylypko was shot and killed by occupying Russian soldiers on 7 March, along with several other volunteers, while delivering food and medicine in the city. His body was reportedly booby trapped by Russian forces. When the local priest came to pick up his body, a sympathetic Russian soldier stopped the priest from getting close, disarmed the trap, and helped load the mayor's body onto a wheelbarrow to be transported away. Yuri was buried near the local church with honors.

Several European mayors expressed their condolences over the death, including Enzo Bianco, president of the National Council of Anci and member of the presidency of the committee of European regions, and Esterino Montino, mayor of Fiumicino, Italy.

References 

1960 births
2022 deaths
21st-century Ukrainian politicians
Mayors of places in Ukraine
People killed in the 2022 Russian invasion of Ukraine
People from Irpin